Eric Robertson Dodds (26 July 1893 – 8 April 1979) was an Irish classical scholar. He was Regius Professor of Greek at the University of Oxford from 1936 to 1960.

Early life and education
Dodds was born in Banbridge, County Down, the son of schoolteachers. His father Robert was from a Presbyterian family and died of alcoholism when Dodds was seven. His mother Anne was of Anglo-Irish ancestry. When Dodds was ten, he moved with his mother to Dublin, and he was educated at St Andrew's College (where his mother taught) and at Campbell College in Belfast. He was expelled from the latter for "gross, studied, and sustained insolence".

In 1912, Dodds won a scholarship at University College, Oxford to read classics, or Literae Humaniores (a two-part four-year degree program consisting of five terms' study of Latin and Greek texts followed by seven terms' study of ancient history and ancient philosophy). Friends at Oxford included Aldous Huxley and T. S. Eliot. In 1916, he was asked to leave Oxford due to his support for the Easter Rising, but he returned the following year to take his final examinations in Literae Humaniores, and was awarded a first-class degree to match the first-class awarded him in 1914 in Honour Moderations, the preliminary stage of his degree. His first tutor at Oxford was A. B. Poynton.

After graduation, Dodds returned to Dublin and met W. B. Yeats and AE (George William Russell). He taught briefly at Kilkenny College and in 1919 was appointed as a lecturer in classics at the University of Reading, where in 1923 he married a lecturer in English, Annie Edwards Powell (1886–1973). They had no children.

Academic career 
In 1924, Dodds was appointed Professor of Greek at the University of Birmingham, and came to know W. H. Auden (whose father George, Professor of Public Medicine and an amateur classicist, was a colleague). Dodds was also responsible for Louis MacNeice's appointment as a lecturer at Birmingham in 1930. He assisted MacNeice with his translation of Aeschylus, Agamemnon (1936), and later became the poet's literary executor. Dodds published one volume of his own poems, Thirty-Two Poems, with a Note on Unprofessional Poetry (1929).

In 1936, Dodds became Regius Professor of Greek at the University of Oxford, succeeding Gilbert Murray. Murray had decisively recommended Dodds to Prime Minister Stanley Baldwin (the chair was in the gift of the Crown) and it was not a popular appointment – he was chosen over two prominent Oxford dons (Maurice Bowra of Wadham College and John Dewar Denniston of Hertford College). His lack of service in the First World War (he had worked briefly in an army hospital in Serbia but later invoked the exemption from military service granted Irish residents) and his support for Irish republicanism and socialism in addition to his scholarship on the non-standard field of Neoplatonism, also did not make him initially popular with colleagues. He was treated particularly harshly by Denys Page at whose college (Christ Church) the Regius Chair of Greek was based.  

Dodds had a lifelong interest in mysticism and psychic research, being a member of the council of the Society for Psychical Research from 1927 and its president from 1961 to 1963.

On his retirement in 1960, Dodds we made an Honorary Fellow of University College, Oxford, until his death in 1979. He died in the village of Old Marston, northeast of Oxford.

Work
Among his works are The Greeks and the Irrational (1951), which charts the influence of irrational forces in Greek culture up to the time of Plato, and Pagan and Christian in an Age of Anxiety, a study of religious life in the period between Marcus Aurelius and Constantine I.

For a bibliography of Dodds' publications see Quaderni di Storia no. 48 (1998) 175-94 (with addenda in the same journal, no. 61, 2005), and for general information on him and studies of some of his works see the bibliography to the entry for him in The Dictionary of British Classicists (2004), vol. 1, 247–51. Add the articles on his work on Neoplatonism in Dionysius 23 (2005) 139-60 and Harvard Studies in Classical Philology 103 (2007) 499–542.

He was also editor of three major classical texts for the Clarendon Press, Proclus: Elements of Theology, Euripides' Bacchae and Plato's Gorgias, all published with extensive commentaries, and a translation in the case of the first. His autobiography, Missing Persons, was published in 1977.

He edited Louis MacNeice's unfinished autobiography The Strings are False (1965) and MacNeice's Collected Poems (1966).

Cultural references
The Berkeley, California punk band The Mr. T Experience recorded a song for their 1988 album, Night Shift at the Thrill Factory, entitled "The History of the Concept of the Soul", which is a two-minute, musical version of lead singer Frank Portman's (also known as Dr. Frank) master's thesis. Dodds' The Greeks and the Irrational is specifically referenced at the end of the song as "footnotes" (including an Ibid) sung by Portman.

Publications

Books
Select Passages Illustrative of Neoplatonism (London: S. P. C. K., 1924) (Texts for Students, 36)
Thirty-Two Poems: With a Note On Unprofessional Poetry (London: Constable, 1929)
Humanism and Technique in Greek Studies: A Lecture (Oxford: Clarendon Press, 1936)
Minds in the Making (London: Macmillan & Co., 1941) (Macmillan War Pamphlets, 14)
The Greeks and the Irrational (Berkeley: University of California Press, 1951) (Sather Classical Lectures, 25)
 Plato, Gorgias, with "revised text with introduction and commentary, by E. R. Dodds". (Oxford: Clarendon Press, 1959)
 Euripides, Bacchae, 2nd edition, "edited with introduction and commentary, by E. R. Dodds". (Oxford: Clarendon Press, 1960)
Morals and Politics in the Oresteia (Cambridge: Cambridge Philological Society, 1960)
Classical Teaching in an Altered Climate (London: John Murray, 1964)
Pagan and Christian in an Age of Anxiety (Cambridge University Press, 1965) (The Wiles Lectures Given At The Queen's University, Belfast, 1963)
 Proclus, The Elements of Theology, "a revised text with translation, by E. R. Dodds". (Oxford: Clarendon Press, 1964)
The Ancient Concept of Progress and Other Essays on Greek Literature and Belief (Oxford: Clarendon Press, 1973)
Missing Persons: An Autobiography (Oxford: Clarendon Press, 1977)

Articles
 "Why I Do Not Believe in Survival" (London: Society for Psychical Research, 1934) (Proceedings of the Society for Psychical Research, part 135, pp. 147-172)
 "Maenadism in the Bacchae". Harvard Theological Review, 1940, 33, 115-76
 "Three notes on the Medea" (Humanitas, 1952, 4, 13-18)
 "Gilbert Murray" (Gnomon, 1957, 29, 476-9)
 "On misunderstanding the Oedipus Rex" (Greece and Rome, 1966, 13, 37-49)
 "Supernormal Phenomena in Classical Antiquity" (London: Society for Psychical Research, 1971) (Proceedings of the Society for Psychical Research, vol. 55, p. 203)

Other
 "Memoir", in Dodds, E. R., ed., Journals and Letters of Stephen MacKenna, London: Constable & Company Ltd., 1936 (Other People's Letters), pp. 1–89.

See also
 Allegorical interpretations of Plato

References

Further reading
 Wayne Hankey, Re-evaluating E. R. Dodds’ Platonism, Harvard Studies in Classical Philology 103 (2005)
 Theodore Nash, Murray and Dodds and Page (oh my!): On the Pleasure and Value of Wissenschaftsgeschichte, in Antigone Journal
 Christopher Stray, Christopher Pelling, and Stephen Harrison, eds., Rediscovering E. R. Dodds: Scholarship, Education, Poetry, and the Paranormal (Oxford UP, 2019)

External links
 
 Donald Russell, Dodds, Eric Robertson, 1893-1979 at The British Academy

1893 births
1979 deaths
People from Banbridge
People educated at St Andrew's College, Dublin
People educated at Campbell College
Alumni of University College, Oxford
Irish classical scholars
Scholars of Greek mythology and religion
Parapsychologists
Irish autobiographers
Classical scholars of the University of Reading
Classical scholars of the University of Birmingham
Regius Professors of Greek (University of Oxford)
Presidents of the Classical Association